Billroth may refer to:
 Theodor Billroth (1829–1894), Prussian-born Austrian surgeon and amateur musician
 Either of the gastrectomy procedures
 Billroth I
 Billroth II